Ned Martel is an American television writer, producer and former columnist.

He is well known for his work on the Fox musical series Glee; and for FXs American Horror Story.

Career
Martel was The Washington Posts style editor from 2009 to 2012, before leaving to work at Ryan Murphy Television and for Murphy himself. He started as an executive story editor on Glees fifth season. Over the course of his time there he contributed two scripts. He was associate producer on HBOs The Normal Heart; and a producer on Inside Look: The People vs. O. J. Simpson, which won him a shared EMMY Award (along with Murphy, Stephanie Gibbons, Sally Daws, and Sue Keeton). Since its fifth year, Martel has served as a writer and co-producer on Murphy and Brad Falchuks American Horror Story; writing episodes "Room Service" and "Battle Royale".

References

External links

Living people
American television writers
American male television writers
Place of birth missing (living people)
Year of birth missing (living people)